Georgia Ponsonby (born 14 December 1999) is a New Zealand rugby union player. She represents New Zealand internationally and was a member of their 2021 Rugby World Cup champion squad. She also plays for Matatū in the Super Rugby Aupiki competition and represents Canterbury provincially.

Rugby career 
Ponsonby attended Feilding High School. She made her debut for Manawatu in the Farah Palmer Cup in 2017. She received a scholarship and went to Lincoln University in Canterbury. She played two seasons for Canterbury at Number 8 before switching to Hooker in 2020.

2021 
Ponsonby was selected for the Black Ferns tour of England and France, but only played in the two test matches against France. She made her Black Ferns test debut off the bench against France in Pau on 13 November. She earned her second cap in the second test match against France.

Ponsonby signed with Matatū for the inaugural Super Rugby Aupiki season in 2022.

2022 
Ponsonby was selected for the Black Ferns squad for the 2022 Pacific Four Series. She made the team again for a two-test series against the Wallaroos for the Laurie O'Reilly Cup in August. She was selected in the Black Ferns squad for the delayed 2021 Rugby World Cup. She scored the first try against England in the World Cup final.

References

External links 

 Black Ferns Profile

1999 births
Living people
New Zealand women's international rugby union players
New Zealand female rugby union players